The 1956 BC Lions finished the season in fourth place in the W.I.F.U. with a 6–10 record and failed to make the playoffs. 

Under former Ottawa bench boss Clem Crowe, the Lions matched their aggregate win total of the first two seasons (6), however, it was only good enough for 4th place in a tough WIFU.  The Lions earned their first win over the Edmonton Eskimos on September 24. Fullback By Bailey scored the first kickoff return touchdown in Lions history against Winnipeg on September 17.

Receiver Dan Edwards, running back Ed Vereb on offence and safety Paul Cameron were WIFU all-stars.

The team altered its uniforms adding UCLA stripes on shoulders.  The helmet was kept orange with single black stripe.

Regular season

Season standings

Season schedule

Offensive leaders

1956 Canadian Football Awards
None

References

BC Lions seasons
1956 Canadian football season by team
1956 in British Columbia